Barbara Stager (born October 30, 1948) is an American woman who was convicted in 1989 of murdering her husband, Russell Stager, in 1988.  Russell was shot while in bed; Barbara reported the shooting as accidental.  Her first husband also died under similar circumstances.

In media
"Till Death Do Us Part: The Barbara Stager Story", is an episode of A&E's television series American Justice, which profiled the case. Jerry Bledsoe also wrote a book in 1994 about the case, entitled Before He Wakes: A True Story of Money, Marriage, Sex and Murder, which was later made into a TV movie in 1998 with the same title starring Jaclyn Smith.  A&E's City Confidential presented its perspective on the case in the 2003 episode "Durham: Dangerous Housewife". Investigation Discovery's Deadly Women series portrayed the story in the 2010 "Fortune Hunters" episode and their Scorned: Love Kills revisited the case in its own "'Til Debt Do Us Part," in 2012. The Forensic Files series had an episode "Broken Promises" about this case; Investigation Discovery examined the case a third time in 2015, with an episode entitled "No Accident" in its Fatal Vows series. In 1999, the Discovery Channel's The New Detectives series, Season 4, Episode 6, "Women Who Kill" featured Barbara Stager's crime.

References

External links
Current status of Barbara Stager, Offender Number: 0386206 - North Carolina Department Of Public Safety (https://webapps.doc.state.nc.us) Offender Public Information
Forensic Files - Season 5, Episode 14: "Broken Promises"
The New Detectives - Season 4, Episode 6: "Women Who Kill"
State of North Carolina v. Barbara T. Stager. (1991)

1948 births
Living people
People convicted of murder by North Carolina
American female murderers
American murderers
American people convicted of murder
American prisoners sentenced to death
American prisoners sentenced to life imprisonment
1988 murders in the United States
Mariticides
Murderers for life insurance money
20th-century American criminals
Prisoners sentenced to death by North Carolina
Prisoners sentenced to life imprisonment by North Carolina